Ben Wilkinson (born 1985 in Stafford, England) is a British poet, academic, and critic for The Guardian. He completed his first degree at the University of Sheffield, and his MA and PhD at Sheffield Hallam University. In 2014, he won both the Poetry Business Book & Pamphlet Competition and a New Writing North Northern Writers' Award. He currently teaches creative writing at the University of Bolton and lives in Sheffield, South Yorkshire. He is a keen amateur distance runner and has written variously on the subject.

Works

Poetry

Edited volumes

Criticism

Awards 

 2018: Forward Prizes for Poetry (Highly Commended)
 2015: Arts Council England Writer's Grant
 2014: Poetry Business Book & Pamphlet Competition
 2014: Northern Writers' Award
 2010: Picador Poetry Prize (shortlist)

Reviews 

It's clear that the love of the beautiful game extends to Wilkinson's poetics, for he embraces a variety of forms and modes of address. From formally dexterous sonnets and sestinas, to epistles and endearing confessionalism, this is a book that likes to keep readers on their toes. Something Wilkinson does well is navigate the dark abyss of clinical depression [...] from "going about / the tedium that strings our lives / together: paperchain people, / baskets lined under strip-lights" ('To David Foster Wallace'), to shivering over a beige Cornish pasty, "ticking over / before some godforsaken motorway service station" ('You Must Be Joking'), there is tenderness and touching honesty to be found in the darker moments he describes. For this reason the collection's title is apt, for its scope reaches way beyond the boundaries of the football pitch and the fabled buzz of excitement, which rather serves as a backdrop against which the poet can stand and inspect the state of his own thumping heart.
- Jade Cuttle, The Poetry Review
“I can’t make you feel what I felt” (David Foster Wallace), one of the epigraphs to Ben Wilkinson’s For Real, is a challenge to which Wilkinson rises with considerable success. His poems are like doors “where no door was bricked up”; they frequently make us wonder how he got through. The same is true of his translations, especially “October”, a fresh and convincing version of Verlaine.
- Andrew McCullouch, The Times Literary Supplement
Whenever I read Ben Wilkinson’s work I find myself admiring his craft. It carries a precision of thought and expression that’s hard to reproduce, in a syntax which is natural and a voice which is easy to hear, yet the poems abound with subtly used devices and effects. Wilkinson disguises his full-rhymes with enjambment, so the audience experience both form and ‘natural flow’ at the same time. He’s always conscious of form, but rarely lets form dictate to him.
- Noel Williams, Antiphon

References

External links 

 Author Page, Seren Books
 Profile Page, The Guardian
Poetry London No.61 (Autumn 2008). Two poems by Ben Wilkinson
Times Literary Supplement 'Poem of the Week': 'The Nightingale' by Ben Wilkinson

1985 births
English poets
English critics
People from Stafford
The Guardian journalists
Alumni of the University of Sheffield
Alumni of Sheffield Hallam University
Writers from Sheffield
Living people
Academics of the University of Bolton